Yoroa is a genus of South Pacific comb-footed spiders that was first described by L. Baert in 1984.  it contains two species, found in Australia and Papua New Guinea: Y. clypeoglandularis and Y. taylori.

The authors when describing a second species from northern Queensland – Yoroa taylori – also revised the descriptions of the genus and New Guinea species with specimens of the previously unknown females.

See also
 List of Theridiidae species

References

Further reading

Araneomorphae genera
Spiders of Asia
Spiders of Australia
Theridiidae